Jangy-Jol is a small village in the Kemin District of Chüy Region of Kyrgyzstan. Its population was 304 in 2021.

References

Populated places in Chüy Region